The R755 road  is a regional road in Ireland. It runs for its entire length in County Wicklow.

Route

It continues south through Roundwood and the hamlet of Annamoe to Laragh where it meets the  Military Road and the Wicklow Gap Road. From Laragh it follows the  Avonmore River for  through  dense conifer forests and  oak woods before terminating in the town of Rathdrum at a junction with the R752.

Like the other main regional roads in the Wicklow Mountains, the R115, R759, R756, R752 and R747 this road passes through some wonderful scenery.

See also

Roads in Ireland
National primary road
National secondary road
Clara, County Wicklow

References
Roads Act 1993 (Classification of Regional Roads) Order 2006 – Department of Transport

Regional roads in the Republic of Ireland
Roads in County Wicklow